Thika is a town in Kenya.

Thika may also refer to:

Thika District, Kenya, of which the town is the capital
Thika River, Kenya
Thika Dam
Thika Road, connecting the town to Nairobi
Empire Minnow, a tug sold in 1948 and renamed Thika